Anne Brugnera (born 28 November 1970) is a French politician of La République En Marche! (LREM) and Territories of Progress (TDP) who has been serving as a member of the National Assembly since the 2017 elections, representing the department of Rhône.

Political career
In parliament, Brugnera serves on the Committee on Cultural Affairs and Education, where she was her parliamentary group's coordinator from 2017 until 2019. In this capacity, she is the parliament's rapporteur on the reconstruction of Notre-Dame de Paris. In 2020, Brugnera joined Territoires de Progrès, a group within LREM created by Jean-Yves Le Drian and Olivier Dussopt.

In July 2019, Brugnera voted in favor of the French ratification of the European Union’s Comprehensive Economic and Trade Agreement (CETA) with Canada.

See also
 2017 French legislative election

References

1970 births
Living people
People from Versailles
Socialist Party (France) politicians
La République En Marche! politicians
Territories of Progress politicians
Deputies of the 15th National Assembly of the French Fifth Republic
Deputies of the 16th National Assembly of the French Fifth Republic
Women members of the National Assembly (France)
21st-century French women politicians
Members of Parliament for Rhône